Ahmed Gaddaf al-Dam (born 1952) is the cousin and aide of former Libyan leader Muammar Gaddafi. He is Libya's former Special Envoy to Egypt and a leading figure of the Gaddafi regime. He was a key member of Gaddafi's inner circle.

Biography

Early life 
Born to a Libyan father and an Egyptian mother in Marsa Matruh in Egypt, Gaddaf al-Dam was educated in military academies and schools in the United Kingdom (where he was classmates with current Egyptian President Abdel Fattah el-Sisi), Turkey, and Pakistan. His maternal uncles live in the Beheira Governorate in Egypt, and they are from the Ben Ali tribes, which are tribes located historically in the areas near the Egypt–Libya border. He was a cousin of Muammar Gaddafi and Said Gaddaf al-Dam, a brigadier general who was described as the second most powerful person in Libya during the 1980s.

Career under Gaddafi 
Gaddaf al-Dam had a role in Gaddafi's security services and served as a personal representative of Muammar Gaddafi in his relations with foreign heads of state. He was instrumental in funneling Libyan cash and weapons to anti-apartheid activists in South Africa and Robert Mugabe's movement against white minority rule in Zimbabwe. He later served as Libya's envoy to Egypt and resided in an apartment in the island of Zamalek, which he returned to after the end of the Libyan Civil War.

Libyan Civil War and flight to Egypt 
In February 2011, Gaddaf al-Dam fled to Egypt shortly after the start of the civil war. Initially, he claimed he had defected, declaring that he was "resigning from all official duties as a means of protest against the way the Libyan crisis was being handled." However, he took a more neutral stance mere weeks later and was sighted in Damascus, fueling speculation that his defection was a ruse to run a secret mission to Syria.

As one of several high-profile Gaddafi loyalists living in Egypt, he was pursued by the new Libyan government and Interpol since the end of the war. In March 2013, after Egyptian police surrounded his home in Cairo and clashed with his guards, Gaddaf al-Dam was arrested by Egyptian authorities on charges of forging official government. He was acquitted after his lawyers argued that he held an Egyptian passport due to his mother and that he had defected from Gaddafi due to his objection to the killing of protesters.

Political activities from abroad 
In October 2014, Gaddaf al-Dam expressed interest in participating in Libyan peace talks.

In October 2016, Gaddaf al-Dam denied Libya's involvement in 1988 Lockerbie Bombing, but acknowledged Gaddafi's involvement in 1986 West Berlin discotheque bombing.

In May 2017, Gaddaf al-Dam endorsed the leadership bid of former Gaddafi foe, Field Marshal Khalifa Haftar.

In October 2017, Gaddaf al-Dam called for reconciliation, the release of Gaddafi loyalists held in Libyan prisons, and for loyalists to be included in any U.N. and Western-brokered political solution. He named Gaddafi's son and former heir apparent, Saif al-Islam Gaddafi, who was released by a militia in Zintan but whose whereabouts was unclear, as someone who needed to be involved in the ongoing peace process.

In March 2018, Gaddaf al-Dam called the arrest of Nicolas Sarkozy, former President of France, on preliminary charges of illegally funding his campaign, passive corruption and receiving money from Libyan embezzlement (alleged Libyan financing in the 2007 French presidential election), "God’s punishment." He claimed he had knowledge of the money transfers and alleged most of the senior Gaddafi regime figures involved in the scandal were imprisoned, dead or in hiding, fearing assassination, including Gaddafi's treasurer Bashir Saleh Bashir, who had survived a shooting in South Africa in February 2018, and Shukri Ghanem, Gaddafi's oil minister who was found drowned to death in the Danube River in Vienna in 2012.

In June 2020, Gaddaf al-Dam spoke out against the Turkish military intervention in the Second Libyan Civil War and warned Recep Tayyip Erdoğan of repercussions.

In August 2020, Gaddaf al-Dam accused the UN and NATO of causing the political crisis in Libya since 2011. He also stated that NATO's 2011 military intervention in Libya was based on falsehoods.

In April 2021, Gaddaf al-Dam predicted that Saif al-Islam Gaddafi would win the Libyan presidential election. In November 2021, Gaddaf a-Dam allegedly brokered a secret meeting in Egypt between Egyptian President Abdel Fattah el-Sisi,  Egyptian Chief of Intelligence Abbas Kamel, and Saif al-Islam Gaddafi, which resulted in Saif's reinstatement as a candidate in the 2021 Libyan presidential election.

In September 2021, Gaddaf al-Dam called for the government of Lebanon to release Hannibal Gaddafi from detention.

References

1952 births
Libyan people of Egyptian descent
Ahmed Gaddaf al-Dam
Libyan politicians
Living people
People of the First Libyan Civil War
Ambassadors of Libya to Egypt